The HP Pavilion dv2000 is a model series of laptops manufactured by Hewlett-Packard Company that features a 14.1" diagonal display.

Models
dv2890nr (Artist Edition) - Features the Artist Edition Imprint finish
dv2700se (Special Edition) - Features the Verve Imprint finish
dv2700bw (Broadband Wireless Series) - Includes a built in WWAN card
dv2700t - Uses An Intel Processor
dv2700z - Uses An AMD Processor
dv2500se (Special Edition) - Features the Verve Imprint finish
dv2500bw (Broadband Wireless Series) - Includes a built in islamiccard
dv2500t - Uses An Intel Processor
dv2500z - Uses An AMD Processor
dv24xx - Uses AMD Processors (DV2410, DV2412, DV2416, DV2419, DV2420)
dv2322la (Latin America) - Uses An Intel Pentium Dual-Core Processor
dv2200la (North-Latin America) - Uses An Intel Core Duo-Core Processor
dv2000t - Uses An Intel Processor
dv2000z - Uses An AMD Processor

Note: The dv2000z series (AMD) was never sold as a CTO option on the HP website.  Pre-configured AMD versions were sold worldwide.

Weight And Dimensions

Note: Weight varies by configuration

Customizable Features
The following are customizable features only available in the United States (HP CTO Notebooks).

Limited Warranty Service Enhancement
HP has identified hardware issues with certain HP Pavilion dv2000/dv6000/dv9000 and Compaq Presario V3000/V6000 series notebook PCs, equipped with nVidia chipsets, most of them with AMD microprocessors.  For the dv2000 series, it includes many models from the dv20xx, dv21xx, dv22xx, dv23xx, and the dv24xx series (where xx is any other 2 digits). The Intel-based dv2000 Core Solo, Core Duo, Core 2 Duo or Pentium Dual Core with the Intel 945 chipset, do not suffer from this problem, except those with dedicated video chip nVidia.

Some symptoms include: 
 The notebook does not detect wireless networks and the wireless adapter is not detected in the Device Manager. 
 There is no video on the computer LCD panel or external monitor (video card failure).
 Problems with the sound system, DVD or Hard Drive.

See also
 Hewlett-Packard
 HP Pavilion (computer)

References

Pavilion dv2000